Eagle Engineering & Motor Company Limited was a manufacturer of light cars in Oakfield Road, Altrincham, Cheshire from 1901 to 1907. Their first product had three wheels. In 1903 they began to produce a nine-horsepower two cylinder car supplanted by a 16-horsepower car which was larger, faster, and more comfortable.

References

Car brands
Defunct motor vehicle manufacturers of England
Vehicle manufacturing companies established in 1901
Vehicle manufacturing companies disestablished in 1907
1901 establishments in England
1907 disestablishments in England
Altrincham
British companies disestablished in 1907
British companies established in 1901